SP-352  is a state highway in the state of São Paulo in Brazil.

References

Highways in São Paulo (state)